Kyabram is a town in north central Victoria, Australia. It is the second-largest town in the Shire of Campaspe, situated between the towns of Echuca and Shepparton and is close to the Murray River, Goulburn River, Campaspe River and Waranga Basin. As of the 2016 census the town had a population of 7,331 people and provides services to a district population of around 16,000. 
Surrounding smaller towns include Merrigum, Lancaster, Undera, Cooma, Wyuna, Kyvalley, Girgarre, Stanhope and Tongala.

The name of the town is thought to derive from an Aboriginal word Kiambram meaning "Thick Forest".

History
The Bangerang people are the original inhabitants of the Goulburn valley.

The township started in the 1870s with the first sale of town blocks held in 1876. Kyabram Post Office opened on 23 September 1878. Sheridan Post Office opened on 1 December 1884. On 8 April 1886, in anticipation of the arrival of the railway at what was then Sheridan, Kyabram was renamed Kyabram East and Sheridan was renamed Kyabram. The Kyabram Mechanics' Institute was built in 1891.

John Allan, who lived in Kyabram from 1873, became Premier of Victoria in 1924 and Australia's first Country Party premier. Allan was associated with the Kyabram Reform Movement, a conservative political organisation formed at the start of the 20th century and led by Benjamin Goddard, a local businessman. The movement's campaign played a significant role in the downfall of the Peacock state government in June 1902 and its sound defeat in the subsequent October election. The incoming Irvine government substantially reduced the number of state parliamentarians, a key demand of the movement.

Kyabram was formally proclaimed a town on 4 July 1973.

The Kyabram Magistrates' Court closed on 1 January 1990.

Economy
The district is dependent on the primary industries of dairying and fruit orchards.  Henry Jones IXL, a subsidiary of SPC Ardmona, operate a plant in the town, manufacturing IXL jams. The town provides engineering, financial advisors, solicitors and accounting services to the district as well as cold storage and specialist dairy services. Kyabram also boasts a family owned Camel dairy unique to Australia. Nestlé (Tongala) downsizing, Southern Processing Ltd and Fonterra (Stanhope) all have food processing plants nearby.

Facilities
Medical and aged care services in the town include a 46-bed hospital, a 30-bed home for the aged, infant welfare centre, ambulance station, several doctors, dentists and other health practitioners. A residential drug and alcohol rehab. Kyabram also has a local police station and volunteer CFA station.

Education
Kyabram has combined three state schools (Kyabram Secondary College, Dawes Rd (Demolished) and Haslem St Primary Schools) to one P-12 school containing three campuses (Dawes, Haslem and Fisher). Kyabram also has a Catholic primary and secondary school (St Augustine's College), two kindergartens and the Kyabram Community & Learning Centre providing community services and adult learning opportunities for the people of Kyabram and the surrounding region.

Kyabram also has their own Blue Light (Kyabram Blue Light) branch run by local police, business owners and community members providing youth engagement activities for young people in the district. The group is well known for their program known as KyFit which is a gym based mentoring program conducted throughout the town weekly, which has been the base for many similar programs country wide. Kyabram Blue Light often enters teams in many local events such as the Massive Murray Marathon and the Mad Cow Mud Run, where local police officers and young people come together to form teams. Kyabram Blue Light is currently headed up by Senior Constable Mitchell Bull, who was named Campaspe Shire's Citizen of the Year 2022.

Media
The local newspaper is called the Kyabram Free Press, a part of the McPherson media group in the region, with a circulation of roughly 3,300 copies (Victorian Country Press Association 2008).

Local police also have a Facebook page distributing local police news, Campaspe Eyewatch

Attractions
Attractions include the Kyabram Fauna Park, a  reserve housing five hundred species of wildlife. There are free-roaming kangaroos and emus and hides to observe a variety of water birds.

Sport 

Popular sports in Kyabram include Australian rules football and cricket. The local football team is known as the Bombers who compete in the Goulburn Valley Football Netball League. 
Netball and soccer are also popular in Kyabram.

Golfers play at the course of the Kyabram Valley View Golf and Bowls Club on Curr Road, Mount Scobie, or at the Kyabram Parkland Golf Club, the home of the Victorian Par 3 Amateur Championships, on Racecourse Rd, Kyabram.

Notable residents
 John Allan, who lived in Kyabram from 1873, became Premier of Victoria in 1924 and Australia's first Country Party premier.
 Felice Arena – author
 Dulcie Boling – magazine editor
 Richard Farleigh – financial investor
 Joe Langtry – Federal MP 
 Hugh McKenzie – Member of Victorian Legislative Assembly
 In 2016, former resident Kristen Hilton was appointed Victoria's Human Rights Commissioner, head of the Victorian Equal Opportunity and Human Rights Commission.
 Kyabram is referenced by Irish singer-songwriter Declan O'Rourke on his debut album Since Kyabram. O'Rourke picked up his first acoustic guitar while living in the town as a teenager.
 Joe Matera – musician
 Russell McDonald – Member of Victorian Legislative Assembly
 Hugh Edward Ryan – priest
 Allan Salisbury – cartoonist

Sport
Kyabram has produced a number of AFL and VFL players:
 Allan Bryce
 Brett Deledio
 Nick Holman
 Tom McCluskey
 Garry Lyon
 Kayne Pettifer
 Arch Shields
 Barrie Vagg
 Julia Crockett-Grills Kyabram's first AFLW's player

Other sports
 Jim Higgs cricketer who played for Australia during the late 1970s.
 Cynna Kydd netball player

References

External links

Kyabram information
Kyabram history
 

Towns in Victoria (Australia)
City of Greater Shepparton